Horizons West is a 1952 American Western film directed by Budd Boetticher and starring Robert Ryan, Julie Adams and Rock Hudson.

Plot
After the Civil War, Brothers Dan and Neil Hammond return to Texas and to their parents' ranch. Neil is happy to simply help run the spread, but Dan's ambition is to build an empire, the way ruthless business tycoon Cord Hardin has.

From the moment they meet, Hardin's wife Lorna has romantic designs on Dan. After a series of confrontations between the two men result in Hardin's death, the two become involved. Dan becomes a powerful figure, overseeing a vast enterprise that involves rustling horses and buying up land by taking advantage of lax laws.  He corrupts many officials and makes many enemies.

When the marshal of Austin is relieved of duty due to his association with Dan, Neil becomes the law and a violent showdown between the brothers is inevitable.

Cast

References

External links
 
 
 

1952 films
1952 Western (genre) films
American Western (genre) films
Films directed by Budd Boetticher
1950s English-language films
1950s American films